Solomiia Dmytrivna Pavlychko (December 15, 1958, Lviv – December 31, 1999, Kyiv) was a Ukrainian literary critic, philosopher, feminist, and translator. She is considered as one of the pioneering scholars to introduce gender studies and feminist analysis to Ukraine.

Biography
Solomiia Pavlychko was born December 15, 1958, in Lviv. Her father was the Ukrainian poet, Dmytro Pavlychko. She graduated in English and French from the Romance-Germanic Faculty of Kyiv University, earning a PhD in English literature in 1984. From 1985 she worked at the National Academy of Science of Ukraine. She was a Doctor of Philosophy, a professor at the University of Kyiv-Mohyla Academy, who in 1990, launched an initiative to found women's studies in Ukraine. Inviting scholars Vira Ageyeva, Tamara Hundorova, and Natalka Shumylo to participate, Pavlychko established a feminist seminar at the Institute of Literature of the National Academy of Sciences of Ukraine in September 1990. It was the first time the methodology of feminist analysis and gender criticism was introduced in the country. These same women established a feminist section in the academic journal Slovo i Chas (Word and Time) and began publishing works such her 1991 article Is a Feminist School Necessary for Ukrainian Literary Studies? The work of these scholars inspired other academics throughout Ukraine to establish women's and gender studies programs.
 
Pavlychko was a member of the Writer's Union of Ukraine. She was also a visiting professor at the University of Alberta, and at Harvard University, where she was a Fulbright fellow. Since 1992 she was the head of the editorial board of the publishing house Osnovy in Kyiv. Pavlychko wrote book-length studies of American romanticism, Byron, the modern English novel and modernism in Ukrainian literature. Her memoir of the first years of Ukrainian independence in 1990-1, Letters from Kiev, was published in English in 1992. She was also a prolific translator: among her Ukrainian translations are William Golding's Lord of the Flies and D. H. Lawrence's Lady Chatterley's Lover. Mrs. Pavlychko also contributed to the work of the World Bank/UNESCO Task Force on Higher Education in Developing Countries, whose report was issued in Feb. 2000. She left unfinished a biography of the Ukrainian poet and orientalist Ahatanhel Krymsky. She died on December 31, 1999.

Works
 The Philosophical Poetry of American Romanticism (Ukrainian, Kyiv 1988)
 Byron: His Life and Works (Ukrainian, Kyiv, 1989)
 Letters from Kyiv (English, Edmonton, 1992)
 The Labyrinths of Thought: The Intellectual Novel of Contemporary Great Britain (Ukrainian, Kyiv, 1993)
 Dyskurs modernizmu v ukrains'kii literaturi [The Discourse of Modernism in Ukrainian Literature] (Ukrainian, Kyiv, 1997, 2nd ed. 1999)

References

External links
 Pavlychko's books published by the Canadian Institute of Ukrainian Studies (CIUS)Press 
 Google books "Post-Soviet Women: from the Baltic to Central Asia" 
 Cambridge Catalogue "Women in Russia and Ukraine" 
 "Feminism, intellectuals and the formation of micro-publics in postcommunist Ukraine" 
 University of Toronto Solomea Pavlychko Stipend Pledge Form 
 Being a Woman in Ukraine 
 Obituary in The Ukrainian Weekly 

1958 births
1999 deaths
People of the Revolution on Granite
Ukrainian feminists
Ukrainian women philosophers
Ukrainian philosophers
Ukrainian literary critics
Women literary critics
20th-century philosophers
Ukrainian translators
Gender studies academics
Feminist writers
English literature academics
20th-century women writers
20th-century translators